is a Japanese manga series by Kinusa Shimotsuki, serialized in Hōbunsha's seinen manga magazine Manga Time Kirara Forward from September 2009 to August 2016. It has been collected intwelve tankōbon volumes as of February 2015.

Plot
The series follows the life of Yuto Sakuraba, a high school boy who is open about his otaku lifestyle,  much to the dismay of his classmates. He works at a shop called Anime Haven. He fawns over an online artist named Sayane because of her moe-styled drawings. At the beginning of the school year, he is assigned a seat next to Kotone Kashiwagi, a popular girl who is known to strongly dislike otaku culture. However, when he discovers that Kotone actually does like anime and manga, they begin a friendship where they discuss their passion in secret. However, Kotone has another secret: she is actually the artist Sayane.  When Yuto eventually makes that connection, he must figure out how it will affect their friendship. Meanwhile, Yuto and Kotone's best friends try to encourage them to advance their relationship together, while ending up coupling themselves.

Characters

The Male Protagonist, openly otaku and unpopular. He's a gentle boy who can be attentive, but also unable to read the mood at times. He discovers Kotone's secret but promises to not tell anyone, thus becoming friends with her. He later realizes he has a crush on Kotone, but tries to take it on his own pace. He's fan of an anime series called . He also works at the anime shop Anime Haven.

The heroine of the series is a timid otaku who is afraid of revealing herself. She's attractive and popular. She usually shows herself as someone who hates Otaku culture, but will reveal her true side to those she trusts. After Yūto discovers she's actually an Otaku, he promises to keep her secret and they become friends. She regularly posts art on a message board under the pseudonym of Sayane. She dislikes being mistaken for a fujoshi. Like Yūto, she's a fan of Gadget Maid.

Kotone's best friend and her self-proclaimed No. #1 fan. She has been a friend of Kotone ever since childhood, and is very protective of her, often smiling and acting friendly on the surface, but hiding her own feelings about this. Kazuki falls in love with Sayaka and confesses to her despite her initial refusal to be involved, but they become a couple. Kotone and Yūto think Sayaka is a bit of a tsundere.

Yūto's best friend. He is not an otaku, but is very popular. He has a crush on Sayaka, ever since he saw her cry during the School Entrance Ceremony. Later, they both start dating.

Kotori manages the Anime Heaven shop where Yūto works. It is later revealed that she is Kotone's older sister. She is 32 years old and is married, and has a short stature and youthful appearance.

Kotori's husband and Kotone's brother-in-law. He's a company employee. He is called "Taku-chan" by Kotori. He's 26 years old. Like Yūto, he's a fan of Gadget Maid.

She is an exchange student from Germany who transferred to Yūto's class. She loves otaku culture and becomes friends with Yuto. She has a boyfriend in Japan, and moved there so she could meet him in real life. She is nicknamed .

Tina's boyfriend.

Media

Manga
As of September 2014, 12 volumes have already been published. The chapters are all unnamed, so they're known only by their number.

Motion Comic
A motion comic, or Manga 2.5, was produced. It ran for 11 episodes.

References

External links

Tonari no Kashiwagi-san Motion Comic on Manga2.5

Houbunsha manga
Seinen manga
Comedy anime and manga
Slice of life anime and manga
Romance anime and manga